Insider is a 2022 South Korean television series starring Kang Ha-neul, Lee Yoo-young, and Heo Sung-tae. It aired from June 8 to July 28, 2022 on JTBC's Wednesdays and Thursdays at 22:30 (KST) time slot for 16 episodes.

Synopsis
The series revolves around a judicial trainee whose life turns upside down when he goes on an undercover investigation, and ends up struggling to try to recover his normal life.

Cast

Main
 Kang Ha-neul as Kim Yo-han, a judicial trainee who lives with his grandmother alone. He goes to jail for an undercover investigation at the suggestion of senior prosecutors.
 Lee Yoo-young as Oh Soo-yeon, a successful businesswoman who made a great fortune through her connections.
 Um Chae-young as young Oh Soo-yeon
 Heo Sung-tae as Yoon Byung-wook, the chief prosecutor of the 2nd Division of Financial Tax Investigation at the Central District Prosecutors' Office.

Supporting

People around Kim Yo-han
 Kim Si-eun as Park Ro-sa, a police officer.
 Moon Sung-keun as Do Won-bong, the outcast king who once shook the political and financial world.
 Ye Soo-jung as Shin Dal-soo, Kim Yo-han's grandmother.

Prosecutors' Office
 Yoo Jae-myung as Noh Young-guk, director of the Judicial Research and Training Institute.
 Kim Sang-ho as Mok Jin-hyung, the chief prosecutor of Northern District Prosecutors' Office.
 Park Sung-geun as Hong Sang-wook, the chief of the investigation division at the Supreme Prosecutors' Office.
 Kang Shin-hyo as Hong Jae-sun, Hong Sang-wook's son and classmate of Kim Yo-han.

Seongju Prison
 Sung Ji-ru as Heo Sang-soo, director of Seongju Prison.
 Kang Young-seok as Jang Seon-oh, a gambling genius who took over the Seongju Prison.
 Choi Dae-hoon as Noh Seung-hwan
 Jo Hee-bong as Ryu Tae-hoon
 Choi Moo-sung as Song Doo-cheol
 Cha Yeop as Kim Gil-sang
 Han Jae-young as Jo Hae-do
 Yoon Byung-hee as Kim Woo-sang
 Han Gyu-won as Uhm Ik-soo

Seocho-dong Cartel
 Heo Dong-won as Yang Jun
 Jung Man-sik as Yang Hwa
 Kim Ji-na as Jin Su-min (Director Jin)

Extended
 Song Jae-hee as Kim Tae-soo, Kim Yo-han's father.
 Choi Ki-beom as a prisoner in the same cell as Kim Yo-han.
 Kim Min-seung as Woo Min-ho
 Jung Hwi-wook as Kwon Dae-il
 Lee Ki-chan as Woo Sang-gi
 Han Seong-su as Lee Tae-kwang
 Han Bo-reum as Annie Stephen
 Yoo Ha-bok as Kim Jeong-gyu
 Lee Ha-yool as Kim Woo-jae

Special appearances
 Jung Woong-in as a second generation chaebol
 Fan Bingbing as Lam, the representative of the Macau Triad.

Production and release
It was reported that the first script reading of the cast was held on May 21, 2021.

The series was initially scheduled for release in the second half of 2021, but was pushed back to 2022.

Original soundtrack

Part 1

Part 2

Viewership

Accolades

Notes

References

External links
  
 
 
 

Korean-language television shows
JTBC television dramas
Television series by JTBC Studios
South Korean action television series
South Korean suspense television series
South Korean thriller television series
2022 South Korean television series debuts
2022 South Korean television series endings